The Çanakçı Rock Tombs are a group of rock-carved tombs in Mersin Province, Turkey.

Geography 

The Çanakçı Rock Tombs are at about  a few hundred meters west of Kanlıdivane sink hole.

The tombs 
The tombs were carved around the 2nd century AD, during Roman Empire period. Each tomb has a rectangular opening. On some of the openings there are inscriptions which condemn potential tomb thieves. Also on some tombs human figures are carved, unquestionably belonging to the bodies in the tombs. There are three human figures in niches near each other, one in a group of two. In one niche there is one human figure.

References

External links 

Some 65 pictures of the rock graves

Ruins in Turkey
Roman sites in Turkey
Archaeological sites in Mersin Province, Turkey
Olba territorium
Rock-cut tombs
Cemeteries in Turkey